LCS1 or variant, may refer to:

 , a U.S. Navy corvette, lead-ship of the Freedom-class littoral combat ship
 Lincoln Calibration Sphere 1, an inert spherical aluminum in-space Earth-orbiting satellite used for calibration designed by the Lincoln Laboratory

See also

 
 LCSI
 LCS (disambiguation)